Biłgoraj pieróg (Polish: Pieróg biłgorajski, piróg biłgorajski, krupniak) is a traditional Polish regional dish, originating from Biłgoraj Land, formerly prepared for important celebrations and holidays.

Pieróg biłgorajski is baked either without a crust - then it's called "bald" (pol. łysy) - or with a yeast dough crust. The filing is based on cooked potatoes, quark and cooked buckwheat groats (kasha). The other ingredients are: eggs, śmietana (sour cream), fatback or lard, mint (fresh or dried) and spices (salt, black pepper). The kneaded dough is formed into a rectangular or circular shape and baked in oven. Optionally, pieróg biłgorajski can be folded in a thin layer of yeast-based dough.

The texture of the pieróg (sing.) is solid, easy to break or crumble, with its appearance resembling that of freshly cooked pâté. May be served hot or cold, with śmietana (sour cream), milk or butter.

A Polish dish with a similar taste is kaszak, which is de facto a bread roll infilled with Biłgoraj pierogi.

Since October 4, 2005 the Biłgoraj pierogi are found on the Polish Ministry of Agriculture and Rural Development's .

See also
Polish cuisine
Lubelszczyzna cuisine

References

Polish cuisine
Savoury pies
Food paste